Lisa J. Hou, D.O. is an American physician and brigadier general. She has served as the Adjutant General of the New Jersey National Guard and  Commissioner of the New Jersey Department of Military and Veterans Affairs since 2021 having been appointed by Governor of New Jersey Phil Murphy. She is the first Asian American and first female Adjutant General in the state.

Background
Dr. Hou earned a bachelors degree (B.A.) in political science from Bryn Mawr College. She joined the New Jersey Army National Guard in 1994 while a medical student at the University of Medicine and Dentistry of New Jersey – School of Osteopathic Medicine in Stratford. Dr. Hou received her Doctorate in Osteopathic Medicine (D.O.) in 1996. Upon graduation from medical school, Dr. Hou completed graduate medical education in both general surgery at St. Barnabas Medical Center (1998) as well as otolaryngology at Union Hospital (2001).  Additionally, Dr. Hou is also qualified as a flight surgeon.

In addition to all of her training in medicine, Dr. Hou went on to earn a distinguished Master's Degree (M.A.) in Strategic Studies from the United States Army War College in 2019 as well as a Masters Degree in Business Administration (MBA) from the Rutgers University - School of Business in 2022.

In August 2020, she became the Chair of the nationwide Army National Guard Medical Advisory Group.

Since 2013, Brig. Gen. Hou has also served as the Region II representative for the National Guard Bureau (NGB) Medical Advisory Group and, from 2018 to 2020, she served as the Chair of the Army National Guard Credentials Certification and Privileging Preparation Board.

In 2011, Brig. Gen. Hou served in Afghanistan as the Field Surgeon for Charlie Company, 700th Brigade Support Battalion, 45th Infantry Brigade Combat Team. She was the sole medical provider on an Afghanistan National Army base and was responsible for providing routine and advanced emergency medical care in the combat theater for more than 600 coalition soldiers, contractors, and foreign nationals.

From 2005 to 2006, Hou served in Iraq as a senior field surgeon for Echo Company, 50th Main Support Battalion, 42nd Infantry Division, New Jersey Army National Guard, where she performed routine and advanced emergency medical care for coalition soldiers and Iraqi civilians and maintained medical readiness for mass casualty trauma. 

She has been a resident of Belmar, New Jersey.

See also
Governorship of Phil Murphy

References

External links 
Brig. Gen. Lisa J. Hou, D.O.

Year of birth missing (living people)
Living people
Bryn Mawr College alumni
New Jersey National Guard personnel
University of Medicine and Dentistry of New Jersey alumni
American osteopathic physicians
American women physicians
American military doctors
United States Army War College alumni
United States Army generals
21st-century American women politicians
State cabinet secretaries of New Jersey
New Jersey Democrats
People from Belmar, New Jersey
21st-century American politicians